This is a list of candidates of the 2014 South Australian state election.

Retiring MPs

Labor
Lyn Breuer MHA (Giles)
Patrick Conlon MHA (Elder)
Robyn Geraghty MHA (Torrens)
John Hill MHA (Kaurna)
Michael O'Brien MHA (Napier)
Gay Thompson MHA (Reynell)
Michael Wright MHA (Lee)
Carmel Zollo MLC

Liberal
Ivan Venning MHA (Schubert)

Other
 Ann Bressington MLC

House of Assembly
Sitting members are shown in bold text. Successful candidates are highlighted in the relevant colour.

Legislative Council
Sitting members are shown in bold text. Tickets that elected at least one member are highlighted in the relevant colour and successful candidates are indicated with an asterisk (*). Eleven of twenty-two seats were up for election. Labor defended four seats. The Liberals defended three seats. The Greens and Family First each defended one seat. The Nick Xenophon Team defended two seats, although only one of their sitting members (John Darley) was seeking re-election.

References
2014 SA election lower house candidates: ECSA
2014 SA election upper house candidates: ECSA
2014 SA election candidates: Antony Green ABC

External links
Lower house how-to-vote cards and upper house above-the-line preference tickets: ECSA

2014 elections in Australia
Candidates for South Australian state elections
2010s in South Australia